This article covers Omaha Landmarks designated by the City of Omaha Landmark Heritage Preservation Commission. In addition, it includes structures or buildings listed on the National Register of Historic Places and those few designated as National Historic Landmarks, indicating their varying level of importance to the city, state and nation.

The following list includes individual properties, as well as historic districts and National Historic Landmarks in Omaha. Residential, commercial, religious, educational, agricultural and socially significant locations are included.

Landmark preservation in Omaha
Omaha has sought to preserve its historic landmarks for more than 50 years.  The first city report on historical sites written in 1959, and the first buildings in the city were listed on the National Register of Historic Buildings in the 1960s. The demolition of the Old Post Office in 1966, along with the Old City Hall the next year, were rallying points for preservationists in the city. Omaha developed a comprehensive plan for landmark preservation in 1980.

Some years, the demands of changing business in Downtown Omaha have overridden the desires of preservationists to maintain historic structures.  In 1989, all 24 buildings of the area's "Jobbers Canyon" were 
demolished, representing the highest number of buildings lost at one time that were listed on the National Register of Historic Places to date.

In April 2001 the Nebraska Methodist Health System purchased the Indian Hills Theater on West Dodge Road and.  In June it announced plans to demolish the theater and replace it with a parking lot. Indian Hills was the last drum-shaped, three-projector Cinerama theater in the United States.  Despite grassroots formation of the Indian Hills Preservation Society, letters of support from Charlton Heston, Janet Leigh and Kirk Douglas, and the unanimous vote of the Omaha Landmarks Heritage Preservation Commission finding that the theater should be declared a Landmark of the City of Omaha, in August 2001 the building was demolished.

City of Omaha Landmarks Heritage Preservation Commission

The first comprehensive preservation ordinance in Nebraska was adopted by the Omaha City Council in 1977. The commission was created after the demolition of the Old Post Office, when the pro-preservation organization Landmarks, Inc. advocated its creation.

As of 2007, more than 90 buildings and structures in Omaha have received federal historic preservation tax incentives, and have been listed by the City of Omaha as Certified Historic Rehabs.

National recognition
Many historic districts, sites, buildings, structures, and objects in Omaha have been listed on the National Register of Historic Places. Three have been designated as National Historic Landmarks by the United States Secretary of the Interior for their historical significance. However, no Omaha Landmarks have been designated National Historic Landmarks, and many have not been listed on the National Historic Register.

Landmarks in Omaha

Former Landmarks 

Being listed on the NRHP or as an Omaha Landmark does not permanently protect buildings against destruction. Several landmarks in Omaha have been demolished through a variety of fashions.

See also
 List of Registered Historic Places in Douglas County, Nebraska
 Architecture in Omaha, Nebraska
 History of Omaha
 Founding figures of Omaha, Nebraska
 Thomas Rogers Kimball
 John Latenser, Sr.
 J.P. Guth

References

Further reading 
 Gerber, K. and Spencer, J.S. (2003) Building for the Ages: Omaha's architectural landmarks. Landmarks, Inc.

External links
 Omaha Landmarks City of Omaha website, including listings for every Omaha Landmark.
 Landmarks, Inc. website.
 Omaha By Design website.
 Restore Omaha Conference, Exhibition & Tour website.
 Collection of photos of Omaha's landmarks.
 .

Landmarks
 
 
 
Landmarks
Landmarks
Locally designated landmarks in the United States
Lists of landmarks